Gokina is a valley settlement situated on the leeward side of the Margalla Hills, 21 km from Islamabad, Pakistan. The hamlet is known for its scenic beauty, lush green meadows, and terrace farming, and attracts many tourists due to its views. The area is filled with pine trees and a natural spring arising from the mountains. The spring, running parallel to the mountains, separates the area into two parts. Its water in some places is stored in local reservoirs for home usage.

Gokina's coordinates are 33°46'9" N 73°3'56" E; it sits slightly over 1000 m above sea level. It sits in a valley near Monal and Talhaar, in Haripur district.

Climate 
Gokina's climate differs from Islamabad. The weather is cool to cold in winters and moderate in summers, with ample sunshine during the warm season.

Source of Income 
Gokina’s residents mostly earn their living through farming and livestock,  mainly cattle and water buffalo. Schools in the area are scarce, so many younger residents have migrated to other cities. Tourism is another major source of income; residents run small shops and sell trinkets to visitors.

Transportation 
The area's mountainous roads are steep, sloppy in bad weather, and narrow, making the valley sometimes difficult to reach. The allure of such surroundings, though, makes the town a tourist draw. Roads are mostly cut out of the mountains, and landslides blocking roads are common. The higher altitudes allow only higher-powered vehicles like pickup trucks to traverse the area. Inhabitants mostly use motor bikes to visit the main cities.

Infrastructure 
Most of the people live in cement houses, while some live in mud huts built near their farms. Electricity is provided by the government, but there is no supply of gas, and people burn wood to cook and for heat. Many mosques of the village, MARKZI jamean masjid ghosiya [{ALLAH}] WALI  exist in the village. A small medical clinic is situated on the outskirts of the village, A medical center is situated on the outskirts of the village,  but the area has no proper hospital, so people must go to the cities for emergencies. The Ghulam Muhammad Memorial Trust(R), Main office at this village, 

Villages in Pakistan